Dunia Dalam Berita (The World In News) is an Indonesian world news program broadcast by TVRI on its main channel. Aired every Monday to Friday at 21.00 WIB (23.00 WIB in 2015 until late-2017), the program airs since 22 December 1978. Lasting about 30 minutes, the news is filled with international news around the world, as well as international sports news and international weather forecast. The program is also one of the longest-running news program in Indonesia.

History 
Dunia dalam Berita began itsbroadcast in December 1978, but the exact date is unclear. A TVRI source said that the program was first aired on 29 December, but sources from the former Indonesian Department of Information and Australian researcher Philip Kitley said that the program was first aired on 22 December.

During the New Order, all commercial television stations (RCTI, SCTV, TPI, ANteve and Indosiar) were required to relay the program alongside the main news program Berita Nasional (later Siaran Berita TVRI). However, the broadcast sometimes delayed by the stations due to certain reasons (live football matches, musical events, or other conditions). The "must-relay" policy was in effect from 13 November 1988 to 31 July 2000, about two years after the New Order's fall.

Name changes
'Dunia Dalam Berita' (The World In News) (22 December 1978 – 12 July 2001, 24 August 2003 – 31 December 2008, 1 March 2015–present)
'Berita Malam' (Nightly News) (13 July 2001 – 23 August 2003)
'Warta Dunia' (World News) (1 January 2009 – 31 December 2010)
'Warta Malam dan Warta Dunia' (World News and Nightly News) (1 January 2011 – 3 June 2012)
'Warta Mancanegara TVRI' (Global News) (4 June 2012 – 28 February 2015)

Announcer

 Monica Khonado
 Rini Soetomo
 Meike Malaon
 Tia Mariadi
 Magdalena Daluas
 Usi Karundeng
 Nita Bonita Yunan
 Yan Partawijaya
 Yasir Denhas
 Herman Zuhdi
 Hasan Asy'ari Oramahi
 Rusjdi Saleh
 Khairul Tamimi
 Sutrimo
 Effendi Moussa
 Adi Priyatmoko
 Tengku Malinda
 Gatot Arismunandar
 Iwan Chandra Lamisi
 Dhoni Kusmanhadji
 Lenny Hadiawati
 Imam Priyono
 Tiya Diran
 Tuti Adhitama
 Sam Amir
 Sazli Rais
 Happy Goeritman 
 Sesko Satrio

References 

Indonesian television news shows
1978 Indonesian television series debuts
1970s Indonesian television series
1980s Indonesian television series
1990s Indonesian television series
2000s Indonesian television series
2010s Indonesian television series
TVRI original programming